UPMC Williamsport, formerly UPMC Susquehanna Williamsport or Williamsport Regional Medical Center, is a 24-hr emergency hospital of UPMC Susquenhana located in Williamsport, Pennsylvania. Originally established in 1873 as the Williamsport Hospital, it currently operates at least 224 beds.

History
Originally established in 1873 as the Williamsport Hospital, UPMC Williamsport, formerly Williamsport Regional Medical Center, is a general medical and surgical hospital in Williamsport, Pennsylvania, operating at least 224 beds. The hospital is accredited by the Commission on Accreditation of Rehabilitation Facilities. Services include the Heart & Vascular Institute, the first intensive care unit in Central Pennsylvania, pharmacy, 24-hour emergency department, inpatient services including same day surgery, a family practice residency program, and more.

Following several industrial accidents that occurred in the early 1870s, members of the Lycoming County Medical Society decided there was a need for a hospital where patients could be fed and cared for in a clean environment. In 1873, upon petition by members of the Lycoming County Medical Society and 23 leading citizens of the community, the Lycoming County Court granted a Charter establishing The Williamsport Hospital.

Williamsport Regional Medical Center was part of an alliance of three hospitals that formed Susquehanna Health in 1994. Williamsport Regional Medical Center became part of the UPMC network when Susquehanna Health was integrated into the University of Pittsburgh Medical Center (UPMC) on October 18, 2016.

2017 fire
On July 25, 2017, the Williamsport Fire Department responded to a reported fire at the hospital. When they arrived, it was revealed that a patient at the hospital had set herself on fire with a lighter. Three hospital employees entered the room to put the woman out; two of them were injured. The woman, who was known to have mental health problems was sent to the burn unit in critical condition. The damage was confined into the patient's room only. After about 10 minutes the evacuation was lifted and the hospital reopened.

Three days later the women died from her injuries.

Services 
The hospital provides a variety of specialties to both adults and children.
Colorectal Surgery
Dermatology
Emergency (38 rooms including:)
4 behavioral health rooms
An orthopedic room
An ear, nose, and throat room
Has an exam chair rather than a bed
2 sexual assault specialty rooms 
Has private doors, bathroom & shower, and are seen by SANE (Sexual Assault Nurse Examiners) nurses
2 critical care rooms
Has an adjacent X-ray & CT scan department
Family Medicine Residency Program
Gastroenterology
 General Surgery
Gynecologic Oncology
 Heart & Vascular Institute
 Imaging Services
Infectious Disease
Internal Medicine
Inpatient Rehabilitation
 Laboratory Services
Neurology
Neurosurgery
OB/GYN
 Orthopedics
Labor & Delivery
Pediatrics (Birth through age 21)
 Pharmacy
Pulmonology
Rehabilitation Services
Reproductive Health Center
 Robotic Surgery
 Spine Care
 Surgery Center
 The Birthplace (Maternity)
Including a Level II nursery
 Urology

See also
List of hospitals in Pennsylvania
University of Pittsburgh Medical Center

References

Buildings and structures in Williamsport, Pennsylvania
Hospitals in Pennsylvania
Hospitals established in 1873
University of Pittsburgh Medical Center
1873 establishments in Pennsylvania